The Glasgow Filmmakers Alliance (GFA) is an online directory listing individuals and companies who are associated with film and television production in and around the city of Glasgow in Scotland. It was founded in 2011 by Scottish actor Andrew O'Donnell and Chris Quick, a Scottish film editor.

History
The idea of the directory came about during the filming of In Search of La Che when Quick felt there was no central place to find professional talent both in front and behind the camera. Soon after filming finished, he discussed the idea with O'Donnell and the pair launched what would become the Glasgow Filmmakers Alliance on 31 October 2011.

In 2012, the alliance was invited by Stephen Paton of Production Attic to form what would become the Glasgow Creative Network which hosts networking events for media professionals in Glasgow.

A supporter of independent film, Quick led a campaign to get the British Academy Scotland New Talent Awards recognised by IMDB stating that 'they represented the best of emerging Scottish talent'. The campaign was successful and the awards were introduced to the site later that year. He later repeated this success with the inclusion of the Virgin Media Short Awards after the first double win by Scottish director John McPhail.

In 2014, Quick and O'Donnell wrote an open letter on behalf of the independent filmmakers of Glasgow to the director of BAFTA Scotland, Jude MacLaverty. In the letter, the pair asked the film body to consider a proposal of including three new awards at the annual ceremony aimed at low budget / independent filmmakers. On 28 October it was announced that the proposal would be placed on the agenda of the next Bafta Scotland Committee meeting in December 2014.

On 2 April 2015, the BAFTA Scotland committee released their response to the proposals put forward by the Glasgow Filmmakers Alliance.

In March 2017, O'Donnell and Quick both signed the open letter to the Arts Council, England, objecting to the organisations decision not to renew the visa for American born actor Tyler Collins.

In May 2019, O'Donnell announced his departure from the organisation and was succeeded by Quick with Gary McLellan taking on the role of deputy.

On 31 December 2021, McLellan stood down as Deputy Director.

Film funding
The alliance has financially contributed small amounts to various films in and around Glasgow. Below is a list of some projects it has supported.

A Fire Within
Bad Blood
Boys Night
Bridge
Bunny
By The Bay
Camp Abercorn
Crime
Custodian
Exodus 21:24
Fertility Daze
Fractured Minds
Frank
In The Fall
Killing Me Softly With Her Love
Murphy's Birthday
Promenade
Ribbons
Sundown
The Naiads
The Outsider
A Practical Guide To A Spectacular Suicide
Tellurian
The Gaelic King
The River Runs Red
Turning Tide
Wait
Wild Is The North
Wonderland

Directors & Deputy Directors

Directors

Deputy Directors

Notes

References

External links
Glasgow Filmmakers Alliance
Glasgow Filmmakers Alliance on Facebook
Glasgow Filmmakers Alliance on Twitter

Organizations established in 2011
Film organisations in Scotland
Organisations based in Glasgow
2011 establishments in Scotland
Television in Scotland
Mass media companies of Scotland
British film websites
Culture in Glasgow
Databases in Scotland
2011 in film
Cinema of Scotland